The Dragova is a right tributary of the river Bistrița in Romania. It flows into the Bistrița in Buhuși.

References

Rivers of Romania
Rivers of Neamț County
Rivers of Bacău County